The 1975–76 Macedonian Republic League was the 32nd since its establishment. FK Bregalnica Shtip won their 3rd championship title.

Participating teams

Final table

External links
SportSport.ba
Football Federation of Macedonia 

Macedonian Football League seasons
Yugo
3